Tom Hanks is an American actor and filmmaker who has had an extensive career in film, television, and stage. Hanks made his professional acting debut on stage playing Grumio in a 1977 Great Lakes Theater production of The Taming of the Shrew. He made his film debut with a minor role in the 1980 horror film He Knows You're Alone. In the same year, Hanks appeared in the television series Bosom Buddies, a role which led to guest appearances on several shows including Happy Days with Ron Howard. Howard cast him in his first leading role in the fantasy romantic comedy Splash. His breakthrough role was in the age-changing comedy Big (1988), for which he garnered his first nomination for the Academy Award for Best Actor.

In 1993, Hanks starred with Meg Ryan in the Nora Ephron-directed romantic comedy Sleepless in Seattle. Later that year he starred in the drama Philadelphia as a gay lawyer with AIDS fighting discrimination in his law firm. For his performance, Hanks earned his first Academy Award for Best Actor. He followed this with the 1994 romantic comedy-drama Forrest Gump, winning a consecutive second Academy Award for Best Actor; he is the first since Spencer Tracy in 1937 and 1938 to achieve this feat. In 1995, he played astronaut Jim Lovell in the Howard-directed historical drama Apollo 13, and voiced Sheriff Woody in the animated film Toy Story (a role which he would reprise in three sequels).

Hanks made his debut as a director and screenwriter with the 1996 musical comedy That Thing You Do! Later that year, he and Gary Goetzman founded the production company Playtone. In 1998, Hanks executive produced the Emmy Award-winning docudrama miniseries From the Earth to the Moon and starred in the Steven Spielberg-directed epic war film Saving Private Ryan, which earned him his fourth nomination for Best Actor at the Academy Awards. Later that year, he reunited with Ryan and Ephron for the romantic comedy You've Got Mail. In 2000, Hanks starred in Cast Away, earning the Golden Globe Award for Best Actor – Motion Picture Drama and a fifth nomination for Academy Award for Best Actor. In 2001, he executive produced the Emmy Award-winning World War II mini-series Band of Brothers and the romantic comedy My Big Fat Greek Wedding. The following year Hanks became the youngest person, at 45, to receive the lifetime achievement award from the American Film Institute.

In 2006, he played Professor Robert Langdon in Howard's The Da Vinci Code, an adaptation of the best-selling book of the same name. In 2008 he executive produced musical comedy Mamma Mia! and the Emmy Award-winning mini-series John Adams. Hanks made his Broadway debut in 2013 in Ephron's play Lucky Guy, which earned him a nomination for the Tony Award for Best Actor in a Play. He portrayed television personality Fred Rogers in the 2019 drama A Beautiful Day in the Neighborhood, for which he garnered nominations for Best Supporting Actor at the Academy Awards, British Academy Film Awards, and Golden Globe Awards.

Film

Television

Stage

Music videos

See also
List of awards and nominations received by Tom Hanks

References

Sources

External links
 
 

 
American filmographies
Director filmographies
Male actor filmographies